Selište, which translates as Settlement in Serbo-Croatian, may refer to several places:

Bosnia and Herzegovina 
Selište, Fojnica, village in the Fojnica municipality
Selište, Jajce, village in the Jajce municipality
Selište, Mostar, village in the Mostar municipality
Selište, Šekovići, village in the Šekovići municipality
Selište, Srbac, village in the Srbac municipality
Selište, Žepče, village in the Žepče municipality

Croatia 
Selište, Croatia, village in the Kutina municipality

Montenegro 
Selište, Montenegro, village in the Podgorica municipality

Serbia 
Selište, Kuršumlija, village in the Kuršumlija municipality
Selište, Prokuplje, village in the Prokuplje municipality
 Selište (Trstenik), village in the Trstenik municipality

See also 
Selishte (disambiguation)
Selišta (disambiguation)
Selişte (disambiguation)
Selišta (disambiguation)
Selishtë, Albania